Louis Milford Pate Jr. (born September 22, 1936) is an American politician who served as a Republican member of the North Carolina General Assembly. He represented the state's eleventh House district from 1995 through 1996 and from 2003 through 2008. His district included constituents in Wayne county. Pate later was elected as the State Senator representing the 7th district (including constituents in Lenoir, Pitt, and Wayne counties). He resigned from the Senate on January 14, 2019, citing his health.

Pate is a former mayor, city council member and retired merchant from Mount Olive, North Carolina.

Pate was a delegate at the 2008 Republican National Convention in St. Paul, Minnesota. The same year, he ran for the North Carolina Senate but was defeated in the general election by Donald G. Davis. He then defeated Davis in a rematch in 2010, and, following redistricting, was elected to represent the new 7th District in 2012.  Pate ran unopposed in 2016.

Pate served 20 years in the Air Force and retired as a Major in 1982. In Vietnam, Pate navigated B-57 bombers. Later in his career, he navigated F-111s.

References

External links
Official NC General Assembly profile
Project Vote Smart - Representative Louis M. Pate Jr. (NC) profile
Follow the Money - Louis M. Pate Jr.
2008 2006 2004 2002 1998 campaign contributions

|-

|-

|-

Republican Party members of the North Carolina House of Representatives
Republican Party North Carolina state senators
1936 births
Living people
Golden Gate University alumni
People from Mount Olive, North Carolina
21st-century American politicians